Haystack Catena (Haystack Vallis until March 2013) is a catena at 4.7° N, 46.2° W on Mercury. It superficially resembles a graben but is a chain of overlapping secondary craters. It was named after Haystack Observatory.

References

Surface features of Mercury